Chloroclystis pyrrholopha is a moth in the family Geometridae. It is found in Australia (Queensland).

References

External links

Moths described in 1907
pyrrholopha